Nawan Lahore  or New Lahore,, is a town located in the Toba Tek Singh District in Punjab, Pakistan.

Geography 

History 
During the 20th century, the town developed as a stopping  point along the Lyallpur-Jhang trade route.

Demographics 
As of 2015, its population was approximately 19,500 people, making it the largest town in Gojra Tehsil.

Government 
The town serves as an educational and trading center. It has a Union Council (one of two in Gojra Tehsil) overseen by Chairman Mian Shamshad-ul-Haq, as well as 4 wards.

It was declared a sub-tehsil of Gojra (the tehsil of Toba Tek Singh) by the government. The offices of the Assistant Commissioner and Deputy Commissioner are due to be constructed there, on government-owned land about 3 to 5 kilometers from the main area of the sub-tehsil.

Education 
Nawan Lahore hosts public and private schools and colleges.

References

Populated places in Toba Tek Singh District

pt:Gojra
war:Gojra